Gabriel Anton, Baron Splény de Miháldy (Ternye, Hungary, 2 October 1734 - Szilvás-Újfalu, Hungary, 1 April 1818) was a nobleman and general of the Austrian Empire during the War of the First Coalition, retiring in 1795, also the first District-Governor of Bukovina  (1774-1778).

External links
A Biographical Dictionary of all Austrian Generals during the French Revolutionary and Napoleonic Wars

1734 births
1818 deaths
People from Prešov District
Hungarian nobility
Field marshals of Austria
18th-century Hungarian people
19th-century Hungarian people
Austrian Empire military leaders of the French Revolutionary Wars
Politicians of Bukovina
Austro-Hungarian politicians